Luxemburger Volksblatt was a newspaper published in Luxembourg between 1901 and 1902.

Defunct newspapers published in Luxembourg
German-language newspapers published in Luxembourg
1901 in Luxembourg
1902 in Luxembourg